Buprestis is a genus of beetles in the tribe Buprestini, the jewel beetles. As of 2011 there were 78 described species distributed across most of the world's biogeographic realms except parts of Africa and Antarctica.

Species include:

 Buprestis adjecta 
 Buprestis aetnensis 
 Buprestis alemanica 
 Buprestis apicipennis 
 Buprestis apricans 
 Buprestis atlas 
 Buprestis auratostriata 
 Buprestis aurora 
 Buprestis aurulenta 
 Buprestis bergevini 
 Buprestis bertheloti 
 Buprestis bilyi 
 Buprestis biplagiata 
 Buprestis carabuho 
 Buprestis catoxantha 
 Buprestis concinna 
 Buprestis confluenta 
 Buprestis connexa 
 Buprestis consularis 
 Buprestis costipennis 
 Buprestis cubensis 
 Buprestis cupressi 
 Buprestis cuprostriata 
 Buprestis dalmatina 
 Buprestis decemspilota 
 Buprestis decipiens 
 Buprestis decora 
 Buprestis deleta 
 Buprestis douei 
 Buprestis dumonti 
 Buprestis esakii 
 Buprestis fairmairei 
 Buprestis fasciata 
 Buprestis flavoangulata 
 Buprestis florissantensis 
 Buprestis fremontiae 
 Buprestis gibbsii 
 Buprestis gracilis 
 Buprestis griseomicans 
 Buprestis guttatipennis 
 Buprestis haardti 
 Buprestis haemorrhoidalis 
 Buprestis hauboldi 
 Buprestis hauseri 
 Buprestis heydeni 
 Buprestis hilaris 
 Buprestis hispaniolae 
 Buprestis humeralis 
 Buprestis intricata 
 Buprestis kashimirensis 
 Buprestis kruegeri 
 Buprestis kudiensis 
 Buprestis laeviventris 
 Buprestis langii 
 Buprestis lebisi 
 Buprestis lineata 
 Buprestis lyrata 
 Buprestis maculativentris 
 Buprestis maculipennis 
 Buprestis magica 
 Buprestis margineaurata 
 Buprestis maura 
 Buprestis megistrache 
 Buprestis metallescens 
 Buprestis meyeri 
 Buprestis mirabilis 
 Buprestis novemmaculata 
 Buprestis nutalli 
 Buprestis octoguttata 
 Buprestis panamensis 
 Buprestis parmaculativentris 
 Buprestis picta 
 Buprestis piliventris 
 Buprestis pongraczi 
 Buprestis pristina 
 Buprestis prospera 
 Buprestis redempta 
 Buprestis rufipes 
 Buprestis rustica 
 Buprestis rusticana 
 Buprestis salisburyensis 
 Buprestis salomonii 
 Buprestis samanthae 
 Buprestis sanguinea 
 Buprestis saxigena 
 Buprestis scudderi 
 Buprestis senecta 
 Buprestis seorsus 
 Buprestis sepulta 
 Buprestis seyfriedi 
 Buprestis splendens 
 Buprestis sterbai 
 Buprestis striata 
 Buprestis strigosa 
 Buprestis subornata 
 Buprestis sulcicollis 
 Buprestis tertiaria 
 Buprestis tincta 
 Buprestis tradita 
 Buprestis transversepicta 
 Buprestis ventralis 
 Buprestis viridistriatus 
 Buprestis viridisuturalis 
 Buprestis zayasi

References

Buprestidae genera